Myrosmodes nervosa is a species of orchid in the genus Myrosmodes.

References

Cranichidinae
Plants described in 1905